RoboSport is a 1991 turn-based tactics computer game. It was created by Edward Kilham and developed and published by Maxis

The player creates teams of robots and maneuvers them around a board to map out one "turn" of movement.  The other players and AI do the same and then all movement is played out simultaneously.  The robots are equipped with different weapons, including rifles, grenade launchers, and so on.  The game supports multiple modes such as capture the flag and a "hostage" game.

Maxis developed this game for DOS, Macintosh and Windows 3.x.  In 1992, it was released for the Amiga.

Reception

The game was reviewed in 1991 in Dragon #172 by Hartley, Patricia, and Kirk Lesser in "The Role of Computers" column. The reviewers gave the game 5 out of 5 stars. Computer Gaming World praised the Windows version of RoboSport for its excellent user interface, ease of programming, and quick play. The magazine concluded that it was "at least three excellent games crammed into one nearly seamless sport". A later article reported that the game depicted small arms and combined arms tactics better "than many computer wargames dedicated to the subject". A 1994 survey in the magazine of strategic space games set in the year 2000 and later gave the game three-plus stars out of five. Alfred Giovetti, writing for Compute!, praised the game for the flexibility of programming computer robots that would then fight providing an interesting outcome.

Reviews
Amiga Format (Nov, 1992)
CU Amiga (Feb, 1993)
Australian Commodore and Amiga Review (Jan, 1993)
The One Amiga (Jan, 1993)
ASM (Aktueller Software Markt) (Aug, 1992)
Amiga Power (Jan, 1993)
Amiga Joker (Dec, 1992)
Amiga Magazine (May, 1993)

References

External links

1991 video games
Amiga games
Classic Mac OS games
Maxis games
Video games developed in the United States
Windows games
Turn-based tactics video games